Ojha is a Brahmin surname.

 Amritlal Ojha (1890–1944), Indian coal miner and businessman
 Anant Kumar Ojha, Indian politician
 Anu Ojha (born 1968), director of the United Kingdom National Space Centre, skydiving expert
 Gaurishankar Hirachand Ojha (1863–1947), historian from the Indian state of Rajasthan
 Har Narayan Ojha, birth name of Swami Karpatri, monk, founder of Akhil Bharatiya Ram Rajya Parishad and guru of current Shankaracharya of puri Swami Nishchalanand Saraswati
 Harshita Ojha, Indian actress in Ek Veer Ki Ardaas...Veera
 Jaya Ojha, Indian film, stage, and television actress and singer
 Krittibas Ojha, medieval poet, the first to translate the Ramayana in Bengali
 Lujendra Ojha, Nepali planetary scientist at NASA
 Nagendra Nath Ojha, Indian politician
 Nainakala Ojha, Nepalese politician
 Naman Ojha, Indian first-class cricketer
 Narayan Dutta Ojha (1926–?), judge and Governor of Madhya Pradesh
 Om Prasad Ojha, Nepalese politician
 Pragyan Ojha, former Indian cricketer
 Pushpa Raj Ojha (born 1959), Nepalese Olympic sprinter
 Puskar Nath Ojha, Nepalese politician
 Queen Oja, Indian politician
 Rajshree Ojha (born 1976), Indian film maker
 Ramesh Bhai Ojha, Hindu spiritual leader
 Sarbadev Ojha, Nepalese politician
 Shivakant Ojha, Indian politician
 S. K. Ojha (1921–1980), Indian film director